The Agelenidae are a large family of spiders in the suborder Araneomorphae. Well-known examples include the common "grass spiders" of the genus Agelenopsis. Nearly all Agelenidae are harmless to humans, but the bite of the hobo spider (Eratigena agrestis) may be medically significant, and some evidence suggests it might cause necrotic lesions, but the matter remains subject to debate. The most widely accepted common name for members of the family is funnel weaver.

Description
Some exceptionally large species, such as Eratigena atrica, may reach  in total leg span.

Agelenids have eight eyes in two horizontal rows of four. Their cephalothoraces narrow somewhat towards the front where the eyes are. Their abdomens are more or less oval, usually patterned with two rows of lines and spots. Some species have longitudinal lines on the dorsal surface of the cephalothorax, whereas other species do not; for example, the hobo spider does not, which assists in informally distinguishing it from similar-looking species.

Biology

Most of the Agelenidae are very fast runners, especially on their webs. A recent literature review found peer-reviewed accounts of several agelenid species achieving speeds in this range, though some other taxa have achieved higher speeds.

Agelenids build a flat sheet of nonsticky web with a funnel-shaped retreat to one side or occasionally in the middle, depending on the situation and species. Accordingly, "funnel weaver" is the most widely accepted common name for members of the family, but they should not be confused with the so-called "funnel-web tarantulas" or "funnel-web spiders" of mygalomorph families.

The typical hunting mode for most sheet-building Agelenidae is similar to that of most other families of spiders that build sheet webs in the open, typically on grass or in scrubland as opposed to under bark, rocks, and the like. They await the arrival of prey such as grasshoppers that fall onto the horizontal web. Although the web is not sticky, it is full of entangling filaments that the spider continually lays down when passing over. The filaments catch in the least projections on a prey insect's body or limbs. The web also is springy, and whether perching on the sheet or awaiting prey in its retreat, the spider reacts immediately to vibrations, whether from a courting male, the threatening struggles of dangerous invaders, or the weaker struggles of potential meals. They attack promising prey by rushing out at high speed and dealing a paralysing venomous bite. The agatoxin in their venom has been studied extensively in Agelenopsis aperta. Once the prey has been disabled, the spider generally drags it back into the retreat and begins to feed. This method of attack is consistent with the high speeds at which the Agelenidae run. Other sheet-web hunters such as some Pisauridae also are very fast runners.

Like any fast-running spider, the Agelenidae possess good vision, and are generally photosensitive (i.e. react to changes in the light), so they can successfully retreat upon perceiving a larger threat's shadow approaching. Some are also sensitive to wind blows, and can retreat before the prey even spots them. Males are less successful ambushers than females, so prefer to roam around and wander to new areas, rather than stay in one single web. In September, males of outdoors species (such as Agelenopsis and Agelena) can seek refuge within houses, usually nesting on or underneath outer windowsills, or also around the porch door. These spiders often are neither pest controllers nor pests themselves; they are very selective in their prey, and do not consume large quantities; also, they are immune to intimidation and come back to their webs even after being disturbed, unless they are completely destroyed.

Parasocial species
The type genus, Agelena, includes some parasocial spiders that live in complex communal webs in Africa.  The best known of these is probably A. consociata. Social behaviour in these spiders comprises communal web-building, cooperative prey capture, and communal rearing of young. No trophallaxis occurs, though, nor does any true eusociality such as occurs in the social Hymenoptera (ants, bees, and wasps); for example, the spiders have no castes such as sterile workers or soldiers, and all females are reproductive.

Medical significance
Only one species of agelenid has become prominent as a putative cause of a significant frequency of necrotic arachnidism; this is the hobo spider, Eratigena agrestis. This perception arose when the species was accidentally introduced to the United States in the mid-20th century and propagated rapidly in several regions. It is a fairly large, rapidly moving spider, so accordingly alarms many people. A few cases of bites have been reported in Southern California by the desert grass spider, Agelenopsis aperta, that resulted in symptoms, but determining whether these cases were confused with similar-looking spiders is difficult.

Genera

, the World Spider Catalog accepts these genera:

Acutipetala Dankittipakul & Zhang, 2008 — Thailand
Aeolocoelotes Okumura, 2020 — Japan
Agelena Walckenaer, 1805 — Africa, Asia, Italy
Agelenella Lehtinen, 1967 — Yemen
Agelenopsis Giebel, 1869 — North America, Ukraine, Asia
Ageleradix Xu & Li, 2007 — China
Agelescape Levy, 1996 — Asia
Ahua Forster & Wilton, 1973 — New Zealand
Allagelena Zhang, Zhu & Song, 2006 — Asia
Alloclubionoides Paik, 1992 — Asia
Asiascape Zamani & Marusik, 2020 — Iran
Aterigena Bolzern, Hänggi & Burckhardt, 2010 — China, Italy, France
Azerithonica Guseinov, Marusik & Koponen, 2005
Bajacalilena Maya-Morales & Jiménez, 2017 — Mexico
Barronopsis Chamberlin & Ivie, 1941 — Cuba, United States
Benoitia Lehtinen, 1967 — Asia, Africa, Spain
Bifidocoelotes Wang, 2002 — China
Cabolena Maya-Morales & Jiménez, 2017 — Mexico
Calilena Chamberlin & Ivie, 1941 — United States, Mexico
Callidalena Maya-Morales & Jiménez, 2017 — Mexico, United States
Coelotes Blackwall, 1841 — Asia, Europe, Mexico
Coras Simon, 1898 — United States, Canada, Korea
Curticoelotes Okumura, 2020 — Japan
Dichodactylus Okumura, 2017 — Japan
Draconarius Ovtchinnikov, 1999 — Asia
Eratigena Bolzern, Burckhardt & Hänggi, 2013 — North America, Europe, Algeria, Asia
Femoracoelotes Wang, 2002 — Taiwan
Flexicoelotes Chen, Li & Zhao, 2015 — China
Gorbiscape Zamani & Marusik, 2020 — Western Mediterranean, Tajikistan
Griseidraconarius Okumura, 2020	 — Japan
Guilotes Zhao & S. Q. Li, 2018 — China
Hadites Keyserling, 1862 — Croatia
Hengconarius Zhao & S. Q. Li, 2018 — China
Himalcoelotes Wang, 2002 — Nepal, Bhutan, China
Histopona Thorell, 1869 — Europe
Hoffmannilena Maya-Morales & Jiménez, 2016 — Mexico, Guatemala
Hololena Chamberlin & Gertsch, 1929 — United States, Canada, Mexico
Huangyuania Song & Li, 1990 — China
Huka Forster & Wilton, 1973 — New Zealand
Hypocoelotes Nishikawa, 2009 — Japan
Inermocoelotes Ovtchinnikov, 1999 — Europe
Iwogumoa Kishida, 1955 — Asia
Jishiyu Lin & Li, 2023 — China
Kidugua Lehtinen, 1967 — Congo
Lagunella Maya-Morales & Jiménez, 2017
Leptocoelotes Wang, 2002 — Taiwan
Lineacoelotes Xu, Li & Wang, 2008 — China
Longicoelotes Wang, 2002 — China, Japan
Lycosoides Lucas, 1846 — Africa, Azerbaijan, Spain
Mahura Forster & Wilton, 1973 — New Zealand
Maimuna Lehtinen, 1967 — Asia, Greece
Malthonica Simon, 1898 — Greece, Portugal, France
Melpomene O. Pickard-Cambridge, 1898 — North America, Central America
Mistaria Lehtinen, 1967 — Kenya, Yemen
Neorepukia Forster & Wilton, 1973 — New Zealand
Neotegenaria Roth, 1967 — Guyana
Neowadotes Alayón, 1995 — Hispaniola
Nesiocoelotes Okumura & Zhao, 2022 — Japan
Notiocoelotes Wang, Xu & Li, 2008 — China
Novalena Chamberlin & Ivie, 1942 — North America, Central America, Trinidad
Nuconarius Zhao & S. Q. Li, 2018 — China
Olorunia Lehtinen, 1967 — Congo
Oramia Forster, 1964 — New Zealand, Australia
Oramiella Forster & Wilton, 1973 — New Zealand
Orumcekia Koçak & Kemal, 2008 — China, Vietnam
Papiliocoelotes Zhao & Li, 2016 — China
Paramyro Forster & Wilton, 1973 — New Zealand
Persilena Zamani & Marusik, 2020 — Iran
Persiscape Zamani & Marusik, 2020 — Western Asia, Greece
Pireneitega Kishida, 1955 — Asia, Europe
Platocoelotes Wang, 2002 — China, Japan
Porotaka Forster & Wilton, 1973 — New Zealand
Pseudotegenaria Caporiacco, 1934 — Libya
Robusticoelotes Wang, 2002 — China
Rothilena Maya-Morales & Jiménez, 2013 — Mexico
Rualena Chamberlin & Ivie, 1942 — United States, Mexico
Sinocoelotes Zhao & Li, 2016 — China, Thailand
Sinodraconarius Zhao & S. Q. Li, 2018 — China
Spiricoelotes Wang, 2002 — China, Japan
Tamgrinia Lehtinen, 1967 — India, China
Tararua Forster & Wilton, 1973 — New Zealand
Tegecoelotes Ovtchinnikov, 1999 — Asia
Tegenaria Latreille, 1804 — Europe, Asia, Africa, North America, Oceania, South America, Jamaica
Textrix Sundevall, 1833 — Asia, Europe, Ethiopia
Tikaderia Lehtinen, 1967 — Himalayas
Tonsilla Wang & Yin, 1992 — China
Tortolena Chamberlin & Ivie, 1941 — United States, Mexico, Costa Rica
Troglocoelotes Zhao & S. Q. Li, 2019 — China
Tuapoka Forster & Wilton, 1973 — New Zealand
Urocoras Ovtchinnikov, 1999 — Europe, Turkey
Vappolotes Zhao & S. Q. Li, 2019 — China
Wadotes Chamberlin, 1925 — United States, Canada
A number of fossil species are known from Eocene aged Baltic amber, but their exact relationship with extant members of the clade is unclear.

See also
 List of Agelenidae species

References

Further reading

External links

 The World Spider Catalog, V13.0

 
Araneomorphae families
Taxa named by Carl Ludwig Koch